Rhadamistus (died 58) was a royal prince of the Pharnavazid dynasty of the Kingdom of Iberia who reigned over the Kingdom of Armenia from 51 to 53 and 54 to 55. He was considered a usurper and tyrant, who was overthrown in a rebellion supported by the Parthian Empire.

Life
Rhadamistus was the eldest son of King Pharasmanes I of Iberia. His mother was an unknown Armenian princess of the Artaxiad dynasty, who was the daughter of the Artaxiad Armenian monarchs Tigranes IV and his sister-wife Erato. Rhadamistus was known for his ambition, extraordinary strength, size of body, good looks and valor. Rhadamistus suffered impatiently an aged father's keeping him so long out of possession of the Kingdom of Iberia, which even if he had it, still seemed too small for satisfaction of his desires. Rhadamistus, by publicly talking about it in his audacious manner scared Pharasmanes as with his own declining years he feared usurpation by his son so he convinced Rhadamistus to make war upon his uncle, King Mithridates of Armenia. Rhadamistus pretended that he was at feud with his father and stepmother and went to his uncle Mithridates. His uncle received Rhadamistus like a son and with an excessive kindness. Later as if he reconciled with his father he returned to Iberia, telling his father that everything was ready and that he must complete this affair by using his sword. Meanwhile, his father, Pharasmanes invented a pretext for war by recalling when he was fighting with the king of the Albanians and appealing to the Romans for help, his brother, had opposed him and he would now avenge him because of that.

Pharasmanes gave his son a large Iberian army, who by a sudden invasion forced Mithridates to take shelter in the fortress of Gorneas, which was strongly garrisoned by the Romans under the command of Caelius Pollio, a camp-prefect, Casperius and a centurion. Rhadamistus reminded his uncle of their tie of being relatives, of the seniority in age of his father, and how he himself was the father-in-law of him, as Rhadamistus was married on Mithridates' daughter Zenobia. Rhadamistus told him that the Iberians were not against peace and urged his uncle to conclude a treaty. Pharasmanes by secret messages had recommended Rhadamistus to hurry on the siege by all possible means.

Later, Pollio, swayed by Rhadamistus' bribery, induced the Roman soldiers to threaten capitulation of the garrison. Under this compulsion, Mithridates agreed to surrender to his nephew and quit the fortress. Rhadamistus seeing his uncle threw himself into his embraces, feigning respect and calling him father-in-law and his parent. He promised that he would do him no harm or violence either by the sword or by poison. He drew him into a neighboring woods, where he assured him that the appointed sacrifice was prepared for their confirmation of peace in the presence of the Iberian gods, as it was their custom, whenever they joined alliance, to unite their right hands and bind together the thumbs in a tight knot and then, when the blood would flow into the extremities, they would let it escape by a slight puncture and then suck it in turn.

But on this occasion the one who was applying the knot pretended that it had fallen off, and suddenly seized the knees of Mithridates flinging him to the ground. At the same moment a rush was made by others, and chains were thrown around him. Rhadamistus was mindful of his promise so he neither unsheathed the sword nor used any poison against his uncle to kill him, but instead had him thrown on the ground and then smothered his uncle under a mass of heavy clothes and featherbeds. Later the sons of Mithridates were also butchered by Rhadamistus for having shed tears over their parent's death. Rhadamistus also killed Mithridates' wife, who was his own sister.

Rhadamistus became King of Armenia in 51. Rome chose not to aid their Armenian allies, as their summoned council said "any crime in a foreign country was to be welcomed with joy". They only nominally demanded from Pharasmanes to withdraw from Armenian territory and remove his son. Despite this, the Roman governor of Cappadocia, Paelignus, invaded Armenia and ravaged the country. Syrian governor Gaius Ummidius Durmius Quadratus sent a force to restore order, but was recalled so as not to provoke a war with Parthia. Consequently, King Vologases I, having recently ascended the Parthian throne and needing a principality for his brother Tiridates, he saw in the situation of Armenia an excellent opportunity of gratifying his brother and advancing his own reputation. To detach Armenia once more from the dominion of Rome and re-attach it to Parthia would be a great inauguration of his reign so he sent his large army into Armenia in 51, eventually driving out the Iberians in 53. A severe winter epidemic and terrible plague forced the Parthians to withdraw from Armenia, allowing Rhadamistus to return who was now fiercer than ever. Rhadamistus treated Armenians with extraordinary severity, looking on them as rebels who could forsake him if such opportunity is given. He punished those Armenian cities that had surrendered to the Parthians, which soon revolted and replaced him with the Parthian prince Tiridates I in 55.

Rhadamistus escaped along with his pregnant wife, Zenobia. Unable to bear a long ride on horse, out of fear of the enemy and love of her husband, she convinced Rhadamistus to kill her with the honourable death to avoid the shame of captivity from their pursuers. Rhadamistus embraced, cheered, and encouraged her wife, admiring  her heroism, he unsheathed his scymitar, stabbed her, dragged her to the bank of the Aras River and committed her to the river stream, so that her body might be swept away. Then in headlong flight he hurried to Iberia, his ancestral kingdom. Zenobia meanwhile as she yet breathed and showed signs of life on the calm water at the river's edge, was found by some shepherds, who inferring from her noble appearance and that she was no base-born woman, bound up her wound and applied to it their rustic remedies. When they found out her name and her adventure, they conveyed her to the city of Artaxata to King Tiridates, who received her kindly and treated her as a royal person. Rhadamistus himself returning home to Iberia was soon, in 58, put to death as traitor who had plotted against the royal power by his own father who wanted to prove his loyalty to Rome, and in particular to Emperor Nero. Pharasmanes died later in the same year as well and he was succeeded by his second son and brother of Rhadamistus, Mihrdat, who became a new king of Iberia.

In art

Paintings
"Radamisto uccide Zenobia" by Luigi Sabatelli (1803).
"Rhadamistes and Zenobia" by Jean-Joseph Taillasson.
"Shepherds Find Zenobia on the Banks of the Araxes" by William Bouguereau (1850)
"Radamisto in atto di spingere Zenobia ferita nel fiume Arasse" by Francesco Alberi.
"Queen Zenobia Thrown Into the Araxes River" by François-Nicolas Chifflart.
"Rhadamiste poignarde sa femme Zénobie" by Etienne Meslier.

Operas
"L’Amour tyrannique" by Georges de Scudéry (1638).
"Zenobia e Radamisto" by Giovanni Legrenzi (1665).
"Radamisto" by Tomaso Albinoni (1698).
"L'amor tirannico, o Zenobia" by Domenico Lalli (1710).
"Rhadamiste et Zénobie" by Prosper Jolyot de Crébillon (1711).
"Radamisto" by George Frideric Handel (1720).
"Radamisto" by Nicola Francesco Haym.
Senesino was first to play Rhadamistus.

Plays
Unfinished play "Rodamist i Zenobiya" by Alexander Griboyedov.

Gallery

References

Sources

Tacitus, Annals, Book XII-XIII
Javakhishvili, Ivane (2012), History of the Georgian Nation, Vol. 1
Crévier, Jean-Baptiste Louis (1814) L'Histoire des empereurs des Romains
Bunson, Matthew (2009) Encyclopedia of the Roman Empire
Toumanoff, Cyril (1969), Chronology of the early Kings of Iberia, Vol. 25
Suny, Grigor Ronald (1994), The Making of the Georgian Nation: 2nd edition, Indiana University Press, 
Rawlinson, George (2012) The Seven Great Monarchies Of The Ancient Eastern World
Cantù, Cesare (1847) Historia universal
Tomlins, Frederick (1844) A Universal History of the Nations of Antiquity

1st-century kings of Armenia
Pharnavazid dynasty
Georgian princes
Roman client kings of Armenia
Familicides
Regicides
Murderers of children
58 deaths
Year of birth unknown
1st-century executions
Executed people from Georgia (country)
Heirs apparent who never acceded
Executed monarchs